The 1949–50 Rugby Union County Championship was the 50th edition of England's premier rugby union club competition at the time.

Cheshire won the competition for the first time after defeating East Midlands in the final.

Final

See also
 English rugby union system
 Rugby union in England

References

Rugby Union County Championship
County Championship (rugby union) seasons